Platina (Spanish for "platinum") is a small unincorporated community in Shasta County, California, approximately and equidistantly  west of Redding and Red Bluff. Its population is 13 as of the 2020 census. Its ZIP code is 96076. Wired telephone numbers follow the pattern 530-352-xxxx.

History
Platina was founded as Noble's Station in 1902, named after Don Noble, a local resident. It served as a stage stop for stagecoaches traveling to and from Red Bluff to Knob, Wildwood, Peanut, and Hayfork. A boarding house, general store and post office were located in the tiny settlement.

During the 1920s, Noble and others discovered platinum in nearby Beegum Creek, causing Noble's Station to quickly become known as "Platina". Platina is a native alloy of platinum with osmium and other related metals.

The current Platina post office was established in 1921. Today, it and the general store stand on almost the same spot as the old station. The store's owners recently tried to sell it and a few other buildings in town on eBay, but were unsuccessful.

Monastery

Saint Herman of Alaska Monastery, a monastic community of the Serbian Orthodox Church, is located just outside of Platina, to the south. It was founded in 1968 by Fr. Herman Podmoshensky and Fr. Seraphim Rose, with the blessing of St. John the Wonderworker, Archbishop of Shanghai and San Francisco. Rose was a graduate of Pomona College and the University of California at Berkeley who converted to Russian Orthodoxy and became a prolific author and translator of ancient Orthodox texts, many of which were printed at the monastery. Fr. Seraphim died September 2, 1982, and is buried in the monastery cemetery.

Fr. Seraphim is revered by many Orthodox Christians around the world, though he has not been formally canonized (as of 2021) by any Orthodox synod.

Politics
In the state legislature Platina is located in the 4th Senate District, represented by Republican Jim Nielsen, and in the 2nd Assembly District, represented by Democrat Wesley Chesbro.

Climate
According to the Köppen Climate Classification system, Platina has a warm-summer Mediterranean climate, abbreviated "Csa" on climate maps.

References

External links

Pilgrimage to Platina. Includes photos of Platina and St. Herman of Alaska Monastery.
St. Herman Press. Website for the St. Herman Press, part of St. Herman of Alaska Monastery.
Seraphim Rose: The True Story and Private Letters'', a biography by author Cathy Scott, Father Seraphim's niece]

Unincorporated communities in California
Unincorporated communities in Shasta County, California
Populated places established in 1902
1902 establishments in California